The Old Catholic Church in Italy was a Union of Utrecht of the Old Catholic Churches (UU) mission in Italy until 2011. Some former missions are in full communion with the Anglican Communion.

The church was a mission of the bishop of the Christian Catholic Church of Switzerland (CKS) until 2011. In June of that year  Bishop , in agreement with the International Old Catholic Bishops' Conference, decided that the  would end its mission in Italy "due to the problematic internal situation." The parishes were "offered a model that guarantees their continued pastoral care." For example, a once Old Catholic parish in Florence is now under the jurisdiction of the Church of England.

References

External links
  

Old Catholicism in Italy
Christian denominations in Italy
1996 establishments in Italy
2011 disestablishments in Italy